International Community of Socialist Youth Organisations (in German: Internationale Gemeinschaft der Sozialistischen Jugendorganisationen) was an international union of socialist youth organizations. It was founded in February 1921. It functioned as the youth wing of the International Working Union of Socialist Parties. Its secretary was Karl Heinz.

It published Die Internationale der sozialistischen Proletarierjugend.

In 1923, it merged into the Socialist Youth International.

Socialist Youth Organisations, International Community of

Youth organizations established in 1921